Antonio de Hornedo Correa (1915–2006) was the Spanish born bishop of Chachapoyas from 1977 to 1991.

Hornedo was born in Comillas, Spain. He joined the Society of Jesus in 1933. In 1963, he was made the prefect of San Francisco Javier, Peru. He was made the titular bishop of Castellum Minas in 1971 and the bishop of Chachapoyas in 1977.

Sources
Catholic hierarchy listing for Hornedo

1915 births
2006 deaths
20th-century Roman Catholic bishops in Peru
20th-century Spanish Jesuits
Roman Catholic bishops of Chachapoyas
Roman Catholic bishops of Jaén in Peru
Spanish emigrants to Peru
Spanish Roman Catholic bishops in South America